Microsoft Management Console (MMC) is a component of Microsoft Windows that provides system administrators and advanced users an interface for configuring and monitoring the system. It was first introduced in 1998 with the Option Pack for Windows NT 4.0 and later came pre-bundled with Windows 2000 and its successors.

Snap-ins and consoles 
The management console can host Component Object Model components called snap-ins. Most of Microsoft's administration tools are implemented as MMC snap-ins. Third parties can also implement their own snap-ins using the MMC's application programming interfaces published on the Microsoft Developer Network's web site.

Snap-ins are registered in the [HKEY_CLASSES_ROOT]\{CLSID} and [HKEY_LOCAL_MACHINE\Software\Microsoft\MMC\Snapins] registry keys. A snap-in combined with MMC is called a management saved console, which is a file with .msc extension and can be launched using this syntax: mmc path \ filename.msc [/a] [/64] [/32].

Common snap-ins 
The most prolific MMC component, Computer Management, appears in the "Administrative Tools" folder in the Control Panel, under "System and Security" in Category View. Computer Management actually consists of a collection of MMC snap-ins, including the Device Manager, Disk Defragmenter, Internet Information Services (if installed), Disk Management, Event Viewer, Local Users and Groups (except in the home editions of Windows), Shared Folders, Services snap-in, for managing Windows services, Certificates and other tools. Computer Management can also be pointed at another Windows machine altogether, allowing for monitoring and configuration of other computers on the local network that the user has access to.

Other MMC snap-ins in common use include:
 Microsoft Exchange Server (up to version 2010)
 Active Directory Users and Computers, Domains and Trusts, and Sites and Services
 Group Policy Management, including the Local Security Policy snap-in; included on all versions of Windows 2000 and later (Home editions of Microsoft Windows disable this snap-in)
 Performance snap-in, for monitoring system performance and metrics

Version history 
 MMC 1.0, shipped with Windows NT 4.0 Option Pack.
 MMC 1.1, shipped with SQL Server 7.0 and Systems Management Server 2.0, and also made available as a download for Windows 9x and Windows NT. New features:
 Snap-in taskpads
 Wizard-style property sheets
 Ability to load extensions to a snap-in at run-time
 HTML Help support
 MMC 1.2, shipped with Windows 2000. New features:
 Support for Windows Installer and Group Policy
 Filtered views
 Exporting list views to a text file
 Persistence of user-set column layouts (i.e. widths, ordering, visibility and sorting of lists)
 MMC 2.0, shipped with Windows XP and Windows Server 2003. New features:
 Operating system-defined visual styles
 Automation object model, allowing the capabilities of an MMC snap-in to be used programmatically from outside MMC itself (e.g. from a script)
 64-bit snap-ins
 Console Taskpads
 View Extensions
 Multilanguage User Interface help files
 MMC 3.0, shipped with Windows Server 2003 SP2, Windows XP SP3 and subsequent versions of Windows. Also downloadable for Windows XP SP2 and Windows Server 2003 SP1. New features:
 A new "Actions pane", displayed on the right-hand side of the MMC user interface that displays available actions for currently-selected node
 Support for developing snap-ins with the .NET Framework, including Windows Forms
 Reduced amount of code required to create a snap-in
 Improved debugging capabilities
 Asynchronous user interface model (MMC 3.0 snap-ins only)
 True Color Icon Support (Windows Vista Only)
 New Add/Remove Snap-in UI
 DEP is always enforced. All snap-ins must be DEP-aware.

See also 
 List of Microsoft Windows components
 Microsoft Windows
 Windows PowerShell

References

External links 
 Microsoft Management Console documentation

Windows components
Microsoft application programming interfaces
System administration
Windows 2000